Sesebo Matlapeng (born 10 January 1992) is a long-distance runner from Botswana.

In 2019, he competed in the senior men's race at the 2019 IAAF World Cross Country Championships held in Aarhus, Denmark. He finished in 55th place.

References

External links 
 

Living people
1992 births
Place of birth missing (living people)
Botswana male long-distance runners
Botswana male cross country runners